Giordan Kariara Harris (born April 19, 1993) is a former competitive swimmer, and current swim coach, from Ebeye Island, Kwajalein Atoll, of the Marshall Islands. Harris is a two-time Olympic swimmer, multiple national record holder, NJCAA All American, and NJCAA & NCAA school record holder. Harris participated in numerous international competitions representing his home country, including the inaugural  2010 Summer Youth Olympics in Singapore, FINA World Long Course Championships, FINA World Short Course Championships, and most notably the 2012 Summer Olympics in London, and the 2016 Summer Olympics in Rio.

Harris was the first athlete from the Marshall Islands to receive the Oceania Australia Foundation Scholarship and the first athlete raised in the islands to receive an athletic scholarship to an NCAA program in the United States.

Harris is the first Oceania Pacific Islander to coach at the NCAA Division II & Division I level.

International career 

 2005 South Pacific Games Mini Games, Koror, in Palau, July 25-August 4, 2005, his first international competition at age 12, Harris was the youngest visiting swimmer to compete.
 2006 6th Micronesian Games, Saipan, in Northern Mariana Islands, June 23-July 2, 2006
 2007 12th FINA World Aquatics Championships, Rod Laver Arena in Melbourne, Australia, 25 March to 1 April 2007
 2010 8th Oceania Swimming Championships, Tuanaimato Aquatic Centre in Apia, Samoa, June 21–26, 2010
 2010 7th Micronesian Games, Koror, Palau, August 1–10, 2010, Silver Medal in Men 400 Meter Free Relay and silver medal in Men 400m Medley Relay
 2010 Summer Youth Olympics, Singapore, August 14–26, 2010 
 2010 10th FINA World Swimming Championships, Dubai, United Arab Emirates, December 15–19, 2010
 2011 14th FINA World Aquatics Championships, Shanghai Oriental Sports Center, Shanghai, China, July 16–31, 2011
2011 Pacific Games, Nouméa, New Caledonia, August 27 to September 10, 2011
 2012 9th Oceania Swimming Championships, Nouméa, New Caledonia, May 28-June 3, 2012
 2012 6th French Open EDF Paris, France, July 6 and 7, 2012
 2012 Summer Olympics, commonly known as London 2012, London, United Kingdom, 27 July to 12 August 2012 - Harris competed in the 50 m Freestyle event. He finished in 46th place in the heats, he did not advance to the semifinals.
 2012 11th FINA World Swimming Championships, Istanbul, Turkey on December 12–16, 2012
 2013 15th FINA World Championships Barcelona, Catalonia, Spain, July 20 to August 4 
 2014 10th Oceania Swimming Championships, Westwave Aquatic Centre in Auckland, New Zealand, May 20–23, 2014
 2014 8th Micronesian Games, Pohnpei, Federated States of Micronesia July 20 to July 30, 2014 - Harris received four bronze medals and 2 Silver Medals.
 2015 Pacific Games, Port Moresby, Papua New Guinea, July 4 to 18, 2015
 2015 16th FINA World Championships, Kazan, Russia, 24 July to 9 August 2015
 2016 11th Oceania Swimming Championships, Damodar Aquatic Centre in Suva, Fiji, June 21–26, 2016 - Harris qualified for "B Finals" in the 50m Butterfly
 2016 Summer Olympics, commonly known as Rio 2016, in Rio de Janeiro, Brazil, August 5 to 21, 2016 - Harris competed in the 50 m Freestyle event. He finished in 63rd place in the heats, he did not advance to the semifinals.

Honors 
2013 Received the Oceania Australia Foundation Scholarship, to Iowa Lakes College

2014 - 2015 Iowa Lakes Community College (NJCAA) Team Captain

2015 NJCAA All American

Training 
Trained with Kwajalein Swim Team until the age of 15.

2010-2012 training location:  Spire Institute, Michael Johnson Performance Center,  Geneva, Ohio, under Coach: Jim Bocci 

2013-2015 training location: Iowa Lakes College, Men's Swimming & Diving, Estherville, Iowa,

2015-2016 training location: The Bolles School - Jacksonville, Florida, under Coach: Jon Sakovich

2016-2018 Maryville University, Maryville University Athletics, St. Louis, MO

Early life 
Giordan was raised on Ebeye Island, the most populous island of Kwajalein Atoll in the Marshall Islands, where his mother, Mary Harris, was born. His mom regularly took him to the lagoon as a baby, where he spent countless hours swimming.  He started swim team at the age of six and was the first swimmer from Ebeye to be a part of Kwajalein Swim Team on the neighboring US military base which houses the only pool in the Marshall Islands.  He traveled to and from practice from Ebeye to Kwajalein, by ferry that took a half hour each way. During training for competitions he would travel back and forth for morning practice and again for evening practice, being on the ferry 4 times in a day.

Giordan is the oldest of three, and has two sisters, Jayana and Jolina.  His sister Jolina, is an elite swimmer with Special Olympics with dreams of swimming at the Olympics like her brother.  He continues to coach her on his visits home.

External links 

 Harris Bio on the official website of the Olympics Page
 2012 Olympics, Training Camp Interview - The Marshall Islands - Olympic Swimmers Making a Splash
 2012 Olympics, Reporters Academy Interview - Giordan recovers to take Personal Best for the Marshall Islands 
 2012 Olympics, Reporters Academy Interview - Team Marshall Islands Reflect on the 30th Olympic Opening Ceremony
 2012 Olympics, Reporters Academy Interview - An update on Team RMI
 2014 The Fourth Branch Interview 
2015 Wire Sports Interview, KAZAN, Russia
 2016 University of Maryville Press Article, "Olympic Mojo"

References

External links
 

Living people
Swimmers at the 2012 Summer Olympics
Swimmers at the 2016 Summer Olympics
Marshallese male swimmers
Olympic swimmers of the Marshall Islands
Swimmers at the 2010 Summer Youth Olympics
1993 births
People from the Ralik Chain